Wetan Island (or Wetang Island) is an island, part of the Babar Islands, in the Moluccas, Indonesia. Its people speak the Wetan language. A species of moth (Theretra wetanensis) was discovered on the island and named for it.

References

Islands of Indonesia
Maluku Islands